The 2010 Russian Women's Football Championship was the 19th edition of the top division in Russian women's football. The competition was doubled from 12 to 24 game weeks, and took place from April 17 — October 17, 2010. For the third year in a row it was contested by seven teams, with Kubanochka Krasnodar replacing disbanded Lada Togliatti to join Energiya Voronezh, ShVSM Izmailovo, WFC Rossiyanka, Ryazan VDV, Zvezda Perm and Zvezda Zvenigorod.

Winning all matches but one, Rossiyanka won its third title, ending Zvezda Perm's dominance in the previous three seasons. Energiya Voronezh also qualified for the 2011-12 Champions League after beating Zvezda Perm in the last match. Zvezda Zvenigorod was disbanded at the end of the season, sparing Kubanochka Krasnodar from relegation.

Table

Results

Top scorers

References

2010
Women
Russia
Russia